Mordechai Benbinisti (born 1 March 1938) is an Israeli footballer. He played in 13 matches for the Israel national football team from 1960 to 1961.

References

External links
 

1938 births
Living people
Israeli footballers
Israel international footballers
Place of birth missing (living people)
Association football defenders
Hapoel Jerusalem F.C. players